An untouchable number is a positive integer that cannot be expressed as the sum of all the proper divisors of any positive integer (including the untouchable number itself). That is, these numbers are not in the image of the aliquot sum function. Their study goes back at least to Abu Mansur al-Baghdadi (circa 1000 AD), who observed that both 2 and 5 are untouchable.

Examples
The number 4 is not untouchable as it is equal to the sum of the proper divisors of 9: 1 + 3 = 4.  The number 5 is untouchable as it is not the sum of the proper divisors of any positive integer: 5 = 1 + 4 is the only way to write 5 as the sum of distinct positive integers including 1, but if 4 divides a number, 2 does also, so 1 + 4 cannot be the sum of all of any number's proper divisors (since the list of factors would have to contain both 4 and 2).

The first few untouchable numbers are
2, 5, 52, 88, 96, 120, 124, 146, 162, 188, 206, 210, 216, 238, 246, 248, 262, 268, 276, 288, 290, 292, 304, 306, 322, 324, 326, 336, 342, 372, 406, 408, 426, 430, 448, 472, 474, 498, ... .

Properties
The number 5 is believed to be the only odd untouchable number, but this has not been proven. It would follow from a slightly stronger version of the Goldbach conjecture, since the sum of the proper divisors of pq (with p, q distinct primes) is 1 + p + q. Thus, if a number n can be written as a sum of two distinct primes, then n + 1 is not an untouchable number. Thus it appears that besides 2 and 5, all untouchable numbers are composite numbers (since except 2, all even numbers are composite). No perfect number is untouchable, since, at the very least, it can be expressed as the sum of its own proper divisors. Similarly, none of the amicable numbers or sociable numbers are untouchable. Also, none of the Mersenne numbers are untouchable, since Mn = 2n − 1 is equal to the sum of the proper divisors of 2n.

No untouchable number is one more than a prime number, since if p is prime, then the sum of the proper divisors of p2 is p + 1. Also, no untouchable number is three more than a prime number, except 5, since if p is an odd prime then the sum of the proper divisors of 2p is p + 3.

Infinitude
There are infinitely many untouchable numbers, a fact that was proven by Paul Erdős. According to Chen & Zhao, their natural density is at least d > 0.06.

See also
 Aliquot sequence
 Nontotient
 Noncototient
 Weird number

References 

 Richard K. Guy, Unsolved Problems in Number Theory (3rd ed), Springer Verlag, 2004 ; section B10.

External links 

Arithmetic dynamics
Divisor function
Integer sequences